Invictus: In the Shadow of Olympus, also known as simply Invictus, is a video game developed by Quicksilver Software, Inc. and published by Interplay for Windows in 2000.

Reception

The game received mixed reviews according to the review aggregation website GameRankings. Eric Bratcher of NextGen said, "This is a brilliant idea for a game, but until the characters learn to walk and follow orders, don't buy into this myth."

References

External links
 

2000 video games
Interplay Entertainment games
Multiplayer and single-player video games
Quicksilver Software games
Real-time strategy video games
Video games based on Greek mythology
Video games developed in the United States
Video games with isometric graphics
Windows games
Windows-only games